K. A. Shakthivel is an Indian cinematographer, primarily working in Tamil cinema.

Early life and career 
He was born in Pattukottai, Tamil Nadu. He received his early training from the Ace Cinematographer turned Director Jeeva. Shakthi started his career by assisting in films such as 12B, Ullam Ketkume, Run, Unnale Unnale, and Anandha Thandavam before becoming independent.

Renigunta was Shakthi's debut film written and directed by newcomer Paneer Selvam. Starring Johnny, son of producer, S. S. Chakravarthy of Nic Arts and newcomers. The film was a success at box office and its cinematography was well-praised including other technical aspects like stunts and editing.

Then he worked on Muppozhudhum Un Karpanaigal starring Adharvaa, Amala Paul written, directed & produced by a newcomer Elred Kumar. Though the film was technically sounded good it bombed in the box office due to its poor content.

Later, he worked on 18 Vayasu, starring Johnny with the same team of Renigunta. And also he working on the multi-starrer Vettai Mannan, starring Silambarasan, Hansika Motwani, Jai, Deeksha Seth which is also written and directed by debutant Nelson.

Moreover, he is handling the cinematography for STR's Love Anthem, an International Music Album, also composed by Silambarasan where the lyrics are penned in several world languages. The music video has been shot with the latest digital cinema camera RED EPIC 5K.

In 2015, much awaited film Vaalu, got released starring STR's And Hansika Motwani with his cinematography.

3 June 2016, his latest movie  Velainu Vandhutta Vellaikaaran hit the screen with positive reviews. In May 2017, he was signed to be the cinematographer of Sandaikozhi 2, which is the sequel of Sandaikozhi.

Filmography

References

Cinematographers from Tamil Nadu
Tamil film cinematographers
Living people
Year of birth missing (living people)